This is a list of Byzantine scientists and other scholars.

Before the 9th century
Most important scholars known before the Macedonian Renaissance were active under the Justinian dynasty.

 Theon of Alexandria (335–405), mathematician
 Hypatia (370–415), mathematician, astronomer, philosopher 
 Anthemius of Tralles (c. 474–before 558), mathematician and architect of Hagia Sophia
 Eutocius of Ascalon (c. 480–c. 540), mathematician
 John Philoponus (490–570), mathematician, physicist, theologian
 Isidore of Miletus (6th century), mathematicist, physicist and architect of Hagia Sophia
 Cassianus Bassus (6th–7th century), author of Geoponika
 Leontios (died 706), emperor, astronomer, mathematician and engineer
 George of Pisidia (6th–7th century), scholar, zoologist and astronomer
 Timotheos of Gaza (6th–7th century), zoologist
 Stephen of Byzantium (6th–7th century), geographer
 Callinicus of Heliopolis (7th century), architect; invented the Greek fire
 Stephen of Alexandria (7th century), mathematician and astronomer

The Macedonian Renaissance
The Macedonian Renaissance occurred in the period of the Macedonian dynasty from 867 to 1056.

 Leo the Mathematician (c. 790–after 869)
 Georgios Monachos (9th century)
 Photius I of Constantinople (c. 810–c. 893), Greek philosophy
 Saint Cyril the Philosopher (826 or 827–869)
 Constantine VII (reigned 913–959)
 Michael Psellus (1018–1078)
 Michael Attaliates (11th century)
 Symeon Seth (11th century)
 Leo VI (reigned 886–912)
 Arethas of Caesarea (c. 860-aft. 932), Archbishop, theologian and Greek commentator

The Komnenian period and after
The Komnenian period ranged from 1081 to about 1185.

 Anna Comnena (1083–1153)
 Theodore Prodromos (c. 1100–c. 1165/70), author of prose and poetry
 Eustathius of Thessalonica (c. 1115–1195/6)
 Michael of Ephesus (early or mid-12th century), philosopher, physics
 Michael Glykas (12th century), mathematician and astronomer
 Joannes Zonaras (12th century), historian
 John Kinnamos (12th century), historian
 Niketas Choniates (c. 1155–1215 or 1216), historian
 Nikephoros Blemmydes (1197–1272)

The Palaiologian Renaissance
The Palaiologian Renaissance was mostly contemporary with the Renaissance of the 12th century. The Palaiologos dynasty ruled from c. 1260 to 1453. A number of Greek scholars contributed to the establishment of this renaissance also in Western Europe.

 Demetrios Pepagomenos (1200–1300), zoologist, botanologist and pharmacist
 George Akropolites (1220–1282), astronomer
 Gregory Chioniades (died 1302), mathematician and astronomer
 Manuel Holobolos (1230–1305), scholar, teacher
 George Pachymeres (1242–1310)
 Manuel Moschopoulos (13th–beginning of the 14th century) grammarian
 Constantinos Lykites (13th–14th century), astronomer
 John Pediasimos (13th–14th century), mathematician
 Nikephoros Choumnos (c. 1250/55–1327), scholar, meteorologist and physicist
 Maximus Planudes (1260–c. 1305), grammarian and theologian,
 Theodore Metochites (1270–1332), physician and mathematician
 Barlaam of Seminara (c. 1290–1348), mathematician and astronomer
 Nicephorus Gregoras (1295–1359/60), mathematician and astronomer
 Demetrius Triclinius (before c. 1300), grammarian with knowledge of astronomy,
 Thomas Magister (14th century), grammarian
 Theodore of Melitene (1320–1393), astronomer
 Isaac Argyros (1310–1372), mathematician and astronomer
 John VI Kantakouzenos (reigned 1347–1355), historian
 Manuel Chrysoloras (c. 1355–1415), translator, philosopher
 Joannes Chortasmenos (1370–1437), scholar, mathematician and astronomer

See also
Byzantine science
Byzantine scholars in Renaissance

References

Sources

Greek scientists
Byzantine
 
Sch